Julius Lieban (19 February 1857 – 1 February 1940) was an Austro-German operatic tenor.

Life 
Lieban was born as the son of a hazzan in Břeclav and learned to play the violin from gypsies in his youth. Later he attended the conservatory of the Gesellschaft der Musikfreunde, studied singing with Josef Gänsbacher and came to the local theatre as a violinist. Afterwards he sang at the Stadttheater in Leipzig and at the Komische Oper in Vienna as opera buffa. In 1881 he took part in the Wagner tour of Angelo Neumann and later sang at the Bayreuth Festival. In 1908 Lieban was appointed Kammersänger. Still in 1933 he sang the Mime at the State Opera at the age of 70. He was successfully engaged for guest performances at many great opera stages all over Europe. His last engagements in Berlin were as a singing teacher. He was married to the soprano Helene Lieban-Globig (31 March 1866 in Berlin – 1919 in Stettin?).

His brothers were the baritone Adalbert Lieban, the bass Adolf Lieban and the baritone Siegmund Lieban.

Lieban died in Berlin at the age of 82. His grave is located in the  where he rests next to his brother Adalbert.

Student 
 Albert Reiss

Further reading 
 Ludwig Eisenberg: Großes biographisches Lexikon der Deutschen Bühne im XIX. Jahrhundert. Paul List publishing house, Leipzig 1903,.
 
 Wilhelm Kosch: Deutsches Theater-Lexikon : biographisches und bibliographisches Handbuch, volume 2, Klagenfurt and Vienna, 1960, .
 Karl-Josef Kutsch, Leo Riemens: Großes Sängerlexikon, Bern-Stuttgart 1987, Sp. 1709/1710.
 Deutsche Biographische Enzyklopädie, vol. 6, 2. A., Munich 2006, .

External links 
 
 

Austrian operatic tenors
German operatic tenors
19th-century Austrian male opera singers
20th-century German male opera singers
1857 births
1940 deaths
People from Břeclav